Pinera or Piñera may refer to:

People 
 Piñera (surname)
 Mike Pinera (born 1948), American musician
 Piñera family, a Chilean political family, including, most notably:
 Sebastián Piñera (born 1949), President of Chile from 2010 to 2014 and 2018 to 2022
Andrés Chadwick Piñera (born 1956), Chilean lawyer, politician, and cousin of Sebastián Piñera

Places

Australia
 Pinera railway station, in Adelaide, South Australia

Spain
 Piñera (Castropol), a parish in Castropol, Asturias
 Piñera (Cudillero), a parish in Cudillero, Asturias
 Piñera (Narcea), a parish in Cangas del Narcea, Asturias
 Piñera (Navia), a parish in Navia, Asturias
 La Piñera, a parish in Morcín, Asturias
 San Juan de Piñera, a parish in Cudillero, Asturias